József Gurovits (23 November 1928 – 3 March 2021) was a Hungarian sprint canoer who competed in the early 1950s. He won a bronze medal in the K-2 10000 m event at the 1952 Summer Olympics in Helsinki. Gurovits was born in Budapest. He was married to speed skater Mária Földvári-Boér. As of 2018 they had been living together in Zürich, Switzerland for 62 years and went back to Hungary once or twice a year. In 2021, Gurovits died in Zurich at the age of 92.

References

József Gurovits' profile at Sports Reference.com

External links
interview at nemzetisport.hu

1928 births
2021 deaths
Hungarian male canoeists
Olympic canoeists of Hungary
Canoeists at the 1952 Summer Olympics
Olympic bronze medalists for Hungary
Olympic medalists in canoeing
Medalists at the 1952 Summer Olympics
Canoeists from Budapest
20th-century Hungarian people